Aquajogging is a cross training and rehabilitation method using low impact resistance training. It is a way to train without impacting joints. Participants wear a flotation device and move in a running motion in the deep end of a pool. Equipment, aside from a pool, can include a flotation belt and weights. It is useful in training for running because the muscles used are similar.

General
Aquajogging can be practised in swimming pools but also in natural waters. You are up to your shoulders in the water, and you can run or walk. A water belt tied around your waist helps you stay afloat and upright. However, the water belt does not have the support of a lifejacket, so the unskilled swimmer needs supervision. In addition to the water belt, you can wear ankle support, water gloves on your hands and water shoes on your feet.

Aquajogging is an effective form of exercise because water is a thousand times denser than air. Aquajogging burns fat and tones effectively. The sport is growing in popularity by leaps and bounds all the time. A buoyant water belt gives the exerciser a lot of extra activity options. The number of deep-water turnovers is increasing. Aquajogging offers a new way of moving around in the water for those who, for one reason or another, are not suited to traditional swimming. The waterbelt can be carried in the water in either an upright or traditional swimming position. It is particularly suitable for people with lower limb arthritis, neck and back pain, overweight people, people with disabilities, people with long-term illnesses, the elderly, children, summer training for open water swimmers, a wide range of rehabilitation needs and athletes for basic and compensatory training. In most cases, aquajogging is more suitable than swimming for people suffering from neck and shoulder tension, as many do not know the correct swimming techniques.

References 

Aquatic therapy
Hydrotherapy
Sports medicine